The relations between Sweden and the United States reach back to the days of the American Revolutionary War. The Kingdom of Sweden was the first country not formally engaged in the conflict (although around a hundred Swedish volunteers partook on the side of the Patriots) to recognize the United States before the Treaty of Paris. The Treaty of Amity and Commerce was signed subsequently in 1783 between Benjamin Franklin and Swedish representative Gustaf Philip Creutz.

In the 1800s, relations were largely cordial.  Masses of Swedes emigrated to the United States from the 1840s–1920s, estimated at around a quarter of the Swedish population.  The immigrants were eager for the promise of opportunity and land; many settled in the American Midwest.  The result was a substantial Swedish American population.  In the 20th century, the countries were fellow democracies (with the end of the Swedish monarchy's power after World War I) and maintained cordial if distant relations.  Sweden maintained official neutrality but supplied nearby Nazi Germany during World War II, causing some tension with the Allies.  

During the Cold War, Sweden did not join NATO and maintained a neutral status between the Western and Eastern Bloc, although its democratic and mixed capitalist approach was generally more in tune with the West and the United States.  After the end of the Vietnam War, which was deeply unpopular in Sweden, relations between the two countries improved.  The two countries have been largely friendly to each other since.
United States supports Sweden's NATO membership. Under a comprehensive mandate, Sweden's nonalignment policy has led it to serve as the protecting power for the United States and to represent Washington in North Korea on consular matters.
U.S. President Joe Biden approved the NATO membership of Finland and Sweden in August 2022.

History

Colonies and early United States

Like many European powers, Sweden participated in the colonization of America that started in the 17th century. The first Swedish colony along the banks of the Delaware River was established in 1638 (see New Sweden).

Sweden under king Gustavus III was the first country not engaged in the American Revolutionary War to recognize the young American republic. The Swedish Count Axel von Fersen was a distinguished soldier during the war, serving as an interpreter between General Rochambeau and General Washington. Also the Swedish count Curt von Stedingk, led the second assault during the Siege of Savannah in 1779. Both were made members of the Society of the Cincinnati.

In 1783 the United States' Ambassador to Paris, Benjamin Franklin, and the Swedish Ambassador, Count Gustaf Philip Creutz, signed a Treaty of Amity and Commerce.

From 1801-02, Sweden was allied with the United States during the First Barbary War, fought against the Barbary corsairs to prevent further disruption of trade in the Mediterranean Sea.

Emigration

During the period between 1820–1930 approximately 1.3 million Swedes, a third of the country's population, emigrated to North America and most of them to the United States. Like the Irish diaspora it was sparked by poverty in Sweden, which was exacerbated during bad years. Only Britain (especially Ireland) and Norway had a higher emigration rate. Most of the Swedish emigrants settled in the central and Western United States. By 1910, Chicago had a greater population of Swedes than Gothenburg. Minnesota was also a place where many Swedish emigrants settled. The majority of Swedish-Americans fought in the American Civil War on the Union side. (See also John Ericsson USS Monitor)

Worsening relations

The first Swedish head of government who met with a US President was Prime Minister Tage Erlander, who visited Harry S. Truman at the White House in 1952.

The period between 1960 and 1968 also marked a cold period in the political relations between Sweden and the U.S., mainly due to the Swedish government's vocal opposition to the Vietnam War. In February 1968, the US recalled its Ambassador from Sweden after the Swedish Minister of Education and future prime minister Olof Palme, a Social Democrat, had participated in a protest in Stockholm against the war together with the North Vietnamese Ambassador to the Soviet Union Nguyen Tho Chan. The post of US Ambassador to Sweden remained vacant until February 1970. In December 1972, Olof Palme (then Prime Minister) made a speech on Swedish national radio where he compared the ongoing US bombings of Hanoi to some of the worst atrocities committed by the Nazis. The US government called the comparison a "gross insult" and once again decided to freeze its diplomatic relations with Sweden (this time the freeze lasted for over a year).

Warmer period

Relations improved when Thorbjörn Fälldin became Swedish prime minister in 1976, and following the assassination of Olof Palme in 1986 and the succession of Ingvar Carlsson as new Prime Minister, Swedish-American relations improved. Ingvar Carlsson met with President Ronald Reagan in 1987, the first time that a Swedish Prime Minister was invited to the White House since 1961, when Erlander paid a visit to Kennedy.

Carlsson's successor as Prime Minister, Carl Bildt, visited both President George H. W. Bush in 1992 and President Bill Clinton in 1994.

Immediately after the September 11, 2001 attacks, the Swedish government expressed its sympathies with the U.S. and supported the U.S.-led invasion of Afghanistan. However, like many other European governments, Sweden opposed the 2003 invasion of Iraq, reasoning that the invasion was a breach of international law. However, Prime Minister Göran Persson was relatively mild in his criticism of the U.S. compared to Olof Palme's strong criticism during the Vietnam War.

In the Statement of Government Policy presented to the Riksdag on October 6, 2006, the new centre-right Prime Minister Fredrik Reinfeldt declared that the new government will work for a "strengthening of the transatlantic link". Reinfeldt's party, the Moderate Party, is more pro-American than the social democrats and supported the 2003 invasion of Iraq and Swedish membership of NATO. Reinfeldt visited President Bush at the White House on May 15, 2007.

According to a 2012 Gallup poll, 36% of Swedes approve of U.S. leadership, with 30% disapproving and 34% uncertain.

Following President Donald Trump's first 2020 presidential campaign rally at which he referred to "what's happening last night in Sweden" the Swedish government requested clarification from the U.S. State Department in regards to Trump's understanding of what was going on in Sweden. On February 19, the Cabinet of Sweden requested an explanation from the White House and the Swedish Embassy in the United States offered to inform the US administration in the future about Swedish immigration and integration policies. On February 23, the Swedish Ministry for Foreign Affairs referred to discussions about Sweden's refugee policies as "simplistic and occasionally completely inaccurate."
On March 6, 2018 Prime Minister Stefan Löfven visited the United States and met with President Donald Trump.

In June 2019, American rapper ASAP Rocky, real name Rakim Mayers, was arrested and held on remand in Sweden over a physical altercation in Stockholm. President Donald Trump made several tweets where he demanded that the Swedish government release Mayers. A spokesperson for prime minister Löfven released a statement in response to Trump's request which stated that the government was not allowed to influence legal proceedings in Sweden and that "everyone is equal before the law".

Relations

Economic
The United States and Sweden have strong economic relations. The United States is, as of 2022, the third-largest Swedish export trade partner, and U.S. companies are the most represented foreign companies in Sweden.

Military
Although Sweden has a longstanding policy of political neutrality in international affairs, Sweden decided to apply for full membership of NATO in May 2022, following the Russian attack on Ukraine. Sweden is a participant in the Euro-Atlantic Partnership Council. Sweden currently participates with around 500 troops in the International Security Assistance Force (ISAF), under the command of NATO, in Afghanistan. Four parties represented in the Parliament, the centre-right Alliance, support NATO membership. During the Libyan Civil War of 2011, the Swedish Air Force worked closely with NATO and the USA.

During the Cold War, the Swedish government secretly made preparations to receive military aid from the United States in case of Soviet aggression.

Sweden also aided the US in secrecy, possibly most famously when four Swedish pilots were awarded US Air Medals for saving the highly classified Lockheed SR-71 Blackbird spy plane from Soviet hands. The US pilots of the SR-71 has stated that had Sweden not intervened and escorted the plane to safety a dramatic escalation to the Cold War could have occurred through an international crisis. The event had been classified for over 30 years, and when the report was unsealed, data from the NSA showed that several MiG-25s had been dispatched with the order to shoot down the SR-71 or force it to land after it had gotten an engine failure. A MiG-25 had locked a missile on the damaged SR-71, but as the aircraft was under escort by the Swedish Saab 37 Viggen pilots no missiles were fired. On 29 November 2018, the four Swedish pilots involved were awarded medals from the US Air Force.

Cultural links
Reflecting the fact that Sweden has a higher proportion of English speakers than most other countries which were never part of the British Empire, Swedish producers and songwriters have played a significant role in the sound of American pop music since the 1990s.  One in particular, Max Martin, has written and produced more Billboard Hot 100 number one hits than any American songwriter or producer.

List of visits

See also 
Foreign relations of Sweden 
Foreign relations of the United States
Swedish Americans
List of Swedish Americans
 Nordic and Scandinavian Americans
Languages of the United States#Swedish
Swedish response to Hurricane Katrina
United States Ambassador to Sweden
List of ambassadors of Sweden to the United States
Sweden-bashing
Nordstjernan (newspaper)

References

Further reading

 Adamson, R. "Swedish iron exports to the United States, 1783–1860" Scandinavian Economic History Review, (1969) 17(1), 58–114.
 Biltekin, Nevra. "Migrating women and transnational relations: Swedish-American connections since the 1920s." Scandinavian Journal of History (2021): 1-19. online
 Blanck, Dag, and Adam Hjorthén, eds. Swedish-American Borderlands: New Histories of Transatlantic Relations (U of Minnesota Press, 2021).
 Blanck, Dag. "'Very Welcome Home Mr. Swanson': Swedish Americans Encounter Homeland Swedes." American Studies in Scandinavia 48.2 (2016): 107-121. online On the 250,000 who went to USA but returned to Sweden.
 Kastrup, Allan. Swedish heritage in America (1975) online
 Kronvall, Olof. "US–Scandinavian Relations Since 1940." in the Oxford Research Encyclopedia of Politics. (Oxford University Press, 2020)
 Müller, Leos. “Swedish-American Trade and the Swedish Consular Service, 1780-1840,” International Journal of Maritime History 14#1 (2002) 173–188.
 O’Dell, Tom. Culture Unbound: Americanization and Everyday Life in Sweden (Lund: Nordic Academic Press, 1997).

External links
 Nordstjernan - The Swedish Newspaper in America
 History of Sweden - U.S. relations

 
United States
Bilateral relations of the United States